I'm Leaving It All Up to You is the debut album by Donny & Marie Osmond, released in 1974. Two singles were released from the album: "I'm Leavin' It (All) Up to You" (US Pop #4, Country #17) and "Morning Side of the Mountain" (US Pop #8).

Track listing
 "I'm Leavin' It (All) Up to You" (Dewey Terry, Don Harris) (2:51)
"Take Me Back Again" (Mike Curb) (2:49)
"A Day Late and a Dollar Short" (Mack David, Mike Curb) (2:17)
"Everything Good Reminds Me of You" (Harley Hatcher) (2:10)
"Gone" (Smokey Rogers) (2:50)
"Morning Side of the Mountain" (Dick Manning, Larry Stock) (3:00)
"True Love" (Cole Porter) (3:17)
"It Takes Two" (William "Mickey" Stevenson, Sylvia Moy) (2:48)
"The Umbrella Song" (Michael Lloyd) (3:22)
"Let It Be Me" (Gilbert Bécaud, Manny Curtis, Pierre Delanoë) (3:09)

Certifications

References

1974 debut albums
Donny Osmond albums
Marie Osmond albums
Albums produced by Mike Curb
MGM Records albums